Udonellidae is a family of flatworms belonging to the order Gyrodactylidea.

Genera:
 Udonella Johnston, 1835

References

Platyhelminthes